Łukasz Nowak (born 18 December 1988, in Poznań) is a Polish race walker.

He finished 6th in the 50 kilometers walk at the 2012 Olympic Games  in London with a new personal best of 3:42:47.

Competition record

Personal bests
Outdoor
 3000 m walk – 11:41.30 (Sosnowiec 2011)
 5000 m walk – 19:24.57 (Katowice 2011)
 10 km walk – 40:40 (Zaniemyśl 2014)
 20 km walk – 1:20:48 (Zaniemyśl 2013)
 50 km walk – 3:42:47 (London 2012)

Indoor
 5000 m walk – 19:13.08 (Sopot 2014)

References

 
https://www.olympic.org/olympic-results

External links 
 
 
 
 

1988 births
Living people
Polish male racewalkers
Athletes (track and field) at the 2012 Summer Olympics
Athletes (track and field) at the 2016 Summer Olympics
Olympic athletes of Poland
Sportspeople from Poznań
World Athletics Championships athletes for Poland